Vladimir "Vlado" Arabadzhiev (born 16 March 1984 in Plovdiv) is a Bulgarian racing driver.

Career

Formula Three
Arabadzhiev began his career in the Italian Formula Three Championship in 2006, finishing the season in 11th in the standings, scoring five points.

Formula 3000
Arabadzhiev moved onto the Euroseries 3000 championship in 2007, where he finished seventh in the standings, scoring 23 points.

Formula Master
Arabadzhiev joined the International Formula Master series in 2008, finishing seventh in the standings for JD Motorsport, taking one win. He remained in the series with JD in 2009, where he finished seventh once again. He was awarded a test for World Touring Car Championship team Chevrolet at the Pembrey Circuit in Wales.

GP2 Series
Arabadzhiev raced in the 2009–10 season of the GP2 Asia Series, for the Rapax Team, which took over Piquet GP after the first round. He also took part in the main series for the 2010 season, moving to Scuderia Coloni to partner Alberto Valerio. After sixteen races without scoring a point, he was replaced by Brendon Hartley.

Racing career

Complete GP2 Series results
(key) (Races in bold indicate pole position) (Races in italics indicate fastest lap)

Complete GP2 Asia Series results
(key) (Races in bold indicate pole position) (Races in italics indicate fastest lap)

References

External links
 Official site
 Career statistics from Driver Database

1984 births
Living people
Sportspeople from Plovdiv
Bulgarian racing drivers
Auto GP drivers
International Formula Master drivers
Italian Formula Three Championship drivers
GP2 Asia Series drivers
GP2 Series drivers
Scuderia Coloni drivers
Piquet GP drivers
Rapax Team drivers
JD Motorsport drivers
DAMS drivers